Calenturitas Airport  is an airport serving the Calenturitas coal mine and the town of La Loma in the Cesar Department of Colombia.

See also

Transport in Colombia
List of airports in Colombia

References

External links
OpenStreetMap - Calenturitas
FallingRain - Calenturitas Airport

Airports in Colombia